Whatever is a 1999 French drama film directed by Philippe Harel, starring Harel and José Garcia. The original French title is Extension du domaine de la lutte, which means "extension of the domain of struggle." It tells the story of a man whose misanthropy goes out of control due to a business trip together with a colleague. It is based on the novel Whatever by Michel Houellebecq.

The film was released on 13 October 1999 through Mars Distribution. It had 55,967 admissions in France.

Cast
 Philippe Harel as Notre héros
 José Garcia as Raphael Tisserand
 Catherine Mouchet as La psy
 Cécile Reigher as Catherine Lechardey
 Marie-Charlotte Leclaire as H. La secrétaire de LA Brette
 Philippe Agael as Buvet
 Christophe Rossignon as Bernard

References

External links 
 

1999 films
Films based on French novels
French drama films
1990s French-language films
Films based on works by Michel Houellebecq
1999 drama films
1990s French films